The molecular formula C21H21O11+ (molar mass: 449.38 g/mol, exact mass: 449.108386 u) may refer to:
 Chrysanthemin or cyanidin 3-O-glucoside
 Ideain or cyanidin 3-O-galactoside, a compound found in Quintinia serrata
 Delphinidin 3-O-α-rhamnoside, a compound found in Vaccinium padifolium